USS Cape May County (LST-521) was an  built for the United States Navy during World War II. Named for Cape May County, New Jersey, she was the only U.S. Naval vessel to bear the name.

LST-521 was laid down on 4 October 1943 at Seneca, Illinois by the Chicago Bridge & Iron Company; launched on 13 December 1943; sponsored by Mrs. Ruth Sexton; and commissioned on 9 February 1944.

During World War II, USS LST-521 was assigned to the European Theater and participated in the Invasion of Normandy in June 1944. Upon her return to the United States, she was decommissioned on 21 October 1945.

Later reactivated (date unknown), assigned to the Military Sea Transportation Service (MSTS) and placed in service as USNS T-LST-521, the tank landing ship was placed out of service (date unknown) and redesignated USS Cape May County (LST-521) on 1 July 1955. The ship was struck from the Naval Vessel Register on 1 November 1959.

LST-521 earned one battle star for World War II service.

References

See also
 List of United States Navy LSTs

LST-491-class tank landing ships
World War II amphibious warfare vessels of the United States
Cold War amphibious warfare vessels of the United States
Ships built in Seneca, Illinois
1943 ships